Sir Ralph Fetherston, 1st Baronet (died May 1780) was an Anglo-Irish politician.

Fetherstone represented Longford County in the Irish House of Commons from 1765 to 1768. Between 1768 and his death in 1780 he represented St Johnstown. On 4 August 1776 he was created a baronet, of Ardagh in the Baronetage of Ireland. On his death his title passed to his son, Thomas Fetherston.

References

Year of birth unknown
1780 deaths
18th-century Anglo-Irish people
Irish MPs 1761–1768
Irish MPs 1769–1776
Irish MPs 1776–1783
Baronets in the Baronetage of Ireland
Members of the Parliament of Ireland (pre-1801) for County Longford constituencies